Grünewald or Grunewald is a surname. Notable people with the surname include:

Adam Grünewald (1902–1945), German SS officer and Nazi concentration camp commandant
Arthur H. Gruenewald (1885-1961), American politician
Matthias Grünewald (c. 1470–1528), German Renaissance painter
Isaac Grünewald (1889–1946), Swedish Modernist painter
Olivier Grunewald (born 1959), French photographer and author
Gabriele Grunewald (1986–2019), American track-and-field athlete

German-language surnames
German toponymic surnames